Mack Alfred Breazeale (15 August 1930 – 14 September 2009) was an American physicist particularly known for his work in ultrasonics and physical acoustics. Breazeale is widely regarded as one of the leading acousticians of the 20th century, highly accomplished in both theory and experiment.
When he died, he was a retired Distinguished Research Professor and Senior Scientist at the National Center for Physical Acoustics at the University of Mississippi. Born in Leona Mines, Virginia, Breazeale grew up near Crossville, TN. Educated at Berea College, the Missouri School of Mines, and the Michigan State University, he was a tireless researcher and trained many others in the field of physics. Before his appointment at the National Center for Physical Acoustics, he was professor of physics at the University of Tennessee (1962-1995) and at Michigan State University (1957-1962). A longtime editor of the Journal of the Acoustical Society of America, he was a fellow of the Acoustical Society of America (ASA) and received its Silver Medal in 1988. He was a fellow of the Institute of electrical and Electronics Engineers and Great Britain's Institute of Acoustics, and had been a Fulbright Research Fellow in Stuttgart, Germany early in his career.

Biography
Breazeale was a Distinguished Research Professor of Physics. Dr Breazeale received his Ph. D. from Michigan State University in 1957. He spent one year as Assistant Research Professor at Michigan State, then went to the University of Stuttgart, Germany, as a Fulbright Fellow. Upon his return to the United States, he spent two years as Assistant Research Professor at Michigan State University, then was appointed Associate Professor of Physics at the University of Tennessee, with a Consultantship at Oak Ridge National Laboratory. He was made full Professor of Physics at UT in 1967. Both at The University of Tennessee and at Oak Ridge National Laboratory he interacted with graduate students and now has 31 students for whom he has served as Major Professor. In 1987 he gave the President's lecture and was named Distinguished Lecturer by the IEEE UFFC Society and gave a total of 39 lectures in the US, China, Japan, Italy and Denmark. He received the silver medal in Physical Acoustics from the Acoustical Society of America in 1988. Breazeale has been at the University of Mississippi National Center for Physical Acoustics since 1988. Dr, Breazeale's specialties were nonlinear acoustics, acoustical parametric interactions, and acoustooptic interactions. He has served as consultant to Oak Ridge, Naval Research Lab., Leeds and Northrup Corp., McDonnell-Douglas Corp., Applications Research Corp.,and Alcon Corp., on subjects related to nonlinear acoustics, optoacoustics, and acoustooptics. His present research involved these subjects applied to condensed matter physics.

Some of Breazeale's PhD students
Nico F. Declercq, co-advisor at Ghent University

References

External links
 Oral history interview transcript with Mack Breazeale on 9 August 2007, American Institute of Physics, Niels Bohr Library & Archives
 
 Worldcat links

1930 births
2009 deaths
20th-century American physicists
Berea College alumni
Experimental physicists
Michigan State University alumni
Michigan State University faculty
Missouri University of Science and Technology alumni
University of Mississippi faculty
University of Tennessee faculty
Fellows of the Acoustical Society of America